Ortigas Avenue is a  highway running from eastern Metro Manila to western Rizal in the Philippines. It is one of the busiest highways in Metro Manila, serving as the main thoroughfare of the metro's east–west corridor, catering mainly to the traffic to and from Rizal.

The western terminus of the highway is at the boundary of San Juan and Quezon City. The highway then traverses through Ortigas Center and along the cities of Mandaluyong, Quezon City, and Pasig, followed by the municipalities of Cainta and Taytay, and finally ending in the city of Antipolo.

The portion of Ortigas Avenue from Eulogio Rodriguez Jr. Avenue (C-5) in Pasig to Taytay Diversion Road in Taytay is designated as a component of Radial Road 5 (R-5). The highway is also designated as National Route 60 (N60) and National Route 184 (N184) of the Philippine highway network, respectively.

Name
The highway is named after Filipino lawyer and businessman Don Francisco Emilio Barcinas Ortigas Sr. (1875–1935), who was popularly known as "Don Paco", or simply as Francisco Ortigas. Ortigas is known for establishing a partnership between him and several businessmen (now Ortigas & Company) to purchase the  Hacienda de Mandaluyon from the Augustinian Order in 1931, which now spans the cities of San Juan, Mandaluyong, Pasig, and Quezon City.

The segment of Ortigas Avenue from Kaytikling Junction to its terminus in Antipolo is part of Corazon C. Aquino Avenue, named in honor of Corazon Aquino, the 11th President of the Philippines.

Route description

Ortigas Avenue cuts eastwards from the city boundary of San Juan and Quezon City in Metro Manila to Antipolo in Rizal, passing through residential, industrial, and commercial areas, including Ortigas Center, its namesake central business district. Its section from Bonny Serrano Avenue to EDSA forms part of National Route 184 (N184), a secondary national road under the Philippine highway network. Meanwhile, the rest of the route east of EDSA forms part of National Route 60 (N60), a primary national road, except for the splitting westbound sections in Antipolo classified as tertiary national roads. These tertiary roads, from west to east, are officially known as Antipolo Diversion Road 1 and Antipolo Diversion Road 2, respectively. Eastwards past the C5–Ortigas Interchange in Pasig, the avenue is called Ortigas Avenue Extension. Its section from Dr. Sixto Antonio Avenue in Pasig to Felix Avenue at the Cainta Junction is officially known as Pasig–Cainta Road and forms part of the Manila East Road. From Cainta Junction to Kaytikling Rotunda in Taytay, it is alternatively known as Cainta-Kayticling-Antipolo-Teresa-Morong Road. Its remaining section eastwards from Kaytikling forms part of Corazon C. Aquino Avenue, formerly known as the Kay Tikling-Antipolo-Teresa-Morong National Road until 2018.

Ortigas Avenue starts as a physical continuation of Granada Street past Bonny Serrano Avenue at the boundary of San Juan and Quezon City. It then cuts through Greenhills, San Juan and northeast of Wack Wack Golf and Country Club in Mandaluyong. It crosses EDSA at the EDSA–Ortigas Interchange at the boundary of Mandaluyong and Quezon City, and runs through Ortigas Center, making a slight curve on Meralco Avenue. The avenue soon cuts through Ugong, enters Pasig, and crosses Circumferential Road 5 at the C5–Ortigas Interchange where the Bridgetowne is located. It soon crosses Marikina River and Manggahan Floodway, partially becomes a single carriageway and changing back into a dual carriageway, and then enters the province of Rizal at Cainta, past SM City East Ortigas (formerly Ever Gotesco Ortigas).

It crosses Bonifacio and Felix Avenues at Cainta Junction. It then continues to Antipolo and passes over the Kaytikling Rotunda with Taytay Diversion Road in Taytay, Rizal before continuing as Manila East Road. Past Kaytikling, it follows winding route to Antipolo, passing through some residential subdivisions before it ends at its intersection with L. Sumulong Memorial Circle and P. Oliveros Street fronting the Hamaka Park near the Rizal Provincial Capitol. It then continues to downtown Antipolo as P. Oliveros Street, which ends near the Shrine of Our Lady of Peace and Good Voyage and another component of Corazon C. Aquino Avenue that leads to Morong.

Intersections

References

See also
List of roads in Metro Manila

Streets in Metro Manila
Roads in Rizal